North End is an electoral ward in the London Borough of Bexley containing the localities of North End, Slade Green, and eastern Erith.

The population of the Ward at the 2011 Census was 11,566. There are approximately 4800 residences within the ward.

Ward Councillors are Alan Deadman, John Eastaugh and Brenda Langstead (all Labour). Councillor advice surgeries are held at the community centre in Slade Green.

References

Wards of the London Borough of Bexley